Aerosol paint (commonly spray paint) is paint that comes in a sealed, pressurized container and is released in an aerosol spray when a valve button is depressed. Aerosol painting is one form of spray painting; it leaves a smooth, even coat, unlike many traditional rolled and brushed paints. Standard-sized cans are lightweight, portable, inexpensive, and easy to store. Aerosol primer can be applied directly to bare metal and many plastics.

Graffiti artists are known to use spray paint because the medium is quick, permanent, and portable. The origin of the product, however, dates back to 1949, when it was designed for the very practical purpose of applying aluminum paint coatings to radiators.

History

In 1949, Edward H. Seymour, of Sycamore, Illinois, added paint to existing spray can technology at his wife Bonnie's suggestion. It was initially designed to demonstrate an aluminum paint he developed. His patent was awarded in 1951.

Most aerosol paints also have a metal, marble, glass or plastic ball called a pea inside of the can, which is used to mix the paint when the can is shaken.

Uses

Commercial, industrial and consumer uses
Acrylic-based craft primers and vinyl dye can be used on plastics like models or miniatures.

Most brands include a wide variety of paints, including primers, heat, and traffic resistant enamels, gloss and matte finishes, metallic colors, and textured paints for home decor.

Aerosol paint is useful for quick, semi-permanent marking on construction and surveying sites. Inverted cans for street, utility or field marking can be used upside-down with an extension pole. APWA (American Public Works Association) has standardized colors for utility and excavation markings. Hiking trails can also be marked with aerosol paint trail blazes.

Small to medium-sized repairs to automobile bodywork can be completed by enthusiasts at home using aerosol paint, though to paint an entire vehicle in this manner would be difficult and expensive. The main disadvantages, compared to a professional spray gun, include the limited quality provided by the built-in nozzle and the lack of infrared baking after applying the paint, which indicates that the paint could take several months to obtain its final hardness.

Technique

For a good finish, it is essential to prepare the surface well, sanding to provide a key and thoroughly degreasing with naphtha (panel wipe).  Areas not to be painted should be masked, although for repair work it is important to avoid spraying a full coat right up to the masking tape, which will leave a hard line; it is better to fade the new paint into the existing paint, especially if the color is difficult to match. The flow of paint should be started or stopped on the masked area rather than over the area intended to be painted, as aerosols often discharge "blobs" of paint under these conditions. Coats should be built up lightly enough to avoid runs, but a "dry" finish must be avoided by spraying too thinly or from too far away. The optimum distance between the can and workpiece is around one foot (30cm).  Most automotive paints will require a clear lacquer after the color coat, normally 24 hours later.  The color coat should be well matted down with very fine abrasive paper before applying the lacquer.

There are also a variety of tools to assist in the dispersal of paints including spray paint handles and attachments to equalize the pressure and secure hand grip. Other customized technology such as sprayprinter can be attached to aerosol cans to partially automate the process of spray painting and allow for images to be created in a manner similar to printing.

Graffiti and street art uses

Speed, portability, and permanence also make aerosol paint a common graffiti medium. In the late 1970s, street graffiti writers' signatures and murals became more elaborate and a unique style developed as a factor of the aerosol medium and the speed required for illicit work. Many now recognize graffiti and street art as a unique art form and specifically manufactured aerosol paints are made for the graffiti artist.

Graffiti artist paints tend to be more expensive, but have a wider selection of rich colors, are thicker and less likely to drip. They are produced in standard high-pressure cans for fast, thick coverage and lower pressure cans for more control and flexibility. Most art brand paints have two or three mixing peas in a can. A wide array of actuators or caps are available, from standard "skinny" caps to wider "fat" caps, as well as caps that control the softness or crispness of the spray. Calligraphy caps create fan spray instead of the standard round.

Stencils

When aerosol paint is used, care must be taken to cover or mask areas where the paint is not wanted. A stencil can be used to protect a surface except for the specific shape that is to be painted. Stencils can be purchased as movable letters, ordered as professionally cut logos, or hand-cut by artists.

Stencils can be used multiple times for recognition and consistency. Official stencils can be used to quickly and clearly label objects, vehicles or locations. Graffiti writers can use stencils to quickly mark in busy places or leave recognizable tags over a large area. Stencil artists often use multiple colors, or create elaborate stencils that are works of art in themselves.

Illicit use

Graffiti

Unauthorized graffiti is considered to be vandalism in most jurisdictions mainly because the work or display is done without permission of the property owner. The term 'aerosol art' is commonly used for displaying art form 'with' permission of the property owner.  The UK and many cities in the United States prohibit the sale of aerosol paint to minors as part of graffiti abatement programs. While major industrial and consumer aerosol paint companies like Krylon and Rust-Oleum actively participate in anti-graffiti programs, art-brand companies are often supportive of writers and graffiti culture, though most do not endorse illegal writing.

Inhalant
Like many household chemicals and aerosols, aerosol paint vapor and propellant can be misused as an inhalant.

See also
 Graffiti
 Monstercolors
 Rust-Oleum
 Krylon
 Vanishing spray

References

External links
 The Plain Man's Guide to Aerosols
 CAPCO is a non-profit organization dedicated to providing accurate information about aerosol products
 The Aerosol Products Division of the Consumer Specialty Products Association also gives facts and relevant information about aerosol products

American inventions
Aerosol sprays
Containers
Graffiti and unauthorised signage
Paints

es:Pulverizador